Federico Favali (Pietrasanta, born 17 June 1981) is an Italian composer of classical music.

Biography 
Raised in Lucca, he began composing as a self-taught student. In 2004 he graduated in piano from Istituto superiore di studi musicali “L. Boccherini” of Lucca, and also graduated in DAMS (fine arts) from the University of Bologna with a thesis on the analysis of the first movement of the quartet op.3 by Alban Berg.

He studied composition at King’s College London, University of Birmingham (PhD), at the Conservatorio “G. Puccini” of La Spezia, at New York University-Steinhardt School.

His music has been performed all over the world (Germany, England, Argentina, Indonesia, Ireland, Australia, South Korea, United States and Japan). Among his various collaborations, the one with the double bass player  Gabriele Ragghianti is worth mentioning.

In 2014 the Teatro del Giglio in Lucca commissioned the opera The fall of the house of Usher, inspired by the tale of Edgar Allan Poe. It was staged at the Teatro San Girolamo of Lucca on 4 May 2014.

In 2015 the Municipality of Lucca awarded him as "Lucca man of the year". In the same year he was invited to Daegu International Contemporary Music Festival (South Korea) and in 2016 at the CrossCurrents Festival in Birmingham. In 2016 and in 2019 he also partecipated in the Lucca Classica Festival.

In 2016 he was composer in residence of the Associazione Musicale Lucchese for the winter chamber music season. In June he organized in the Auditorium San Francesco in Lucca the concert "Harmony of the infinite. From San Francesco to the world. Music", dedicated to his music and to the music of the composers from Lucca.

As a musicologist he mainly deals with the musical analysis of contemporary music. His fields of research are the music of György Ligeti, the music of Thomas Adès, the relationship between Jorge Luis Borges's poetics and contemporary music and the relationships between mathematics and music.

Main recent compositions

Chamber music and ensemble 
 Yemaya (2013)
 Hypothetical spaces (2014)
 Ombre di spazi e silenzi (2014)
 Quando passai di qui era di notte (2015)
 Time, old age, beauty (2015)

Solo instrument 
 Raggio di sole di miele (2010)
 Empire of the light (2012)
 Intimate memories (2013)
 The world is on fire (2015)
 Zreg (2015)
 Metalogicalities (2016)

Vocal music 
 Ocean of time (2012)
 Beltà poiché t’assenti (2013)
 Spontanea terra (2014)

Orchestra 
 La meravigliosa storia delle onde del mare (2011)
 Sun salutation (2017)

Theatre 
 Il crollo di casa Usher (2013–2014)

References

External links 
 Official website

1981 births
21st-century classical composers
21st-century Italian musicians
Italian classical composers
Italian classical musicians
Italian male classical composers
Italian opera composers
Living people
Alumni of King's College London
Male opera composers
People from Pietrasanta
21st-century Italian male musicians